The 2015 Bangladesh Federation Cup is the 27th edition to be played. It was played between 16 February and 5 March 2015 (originally to start on 19 December 2014). 11 teams from the Bangladesh Premier League along with one invited team will take part in the season's curtain-raiser.

Draw

The draw ceremony of the tournament were held at BFF house Motijheel, Dhaka on 12 February 2015.The twelve participants were divided into four groups. Top two teams from each group will enter the quarter-finals.

Venue

Group stages
All matches were played at Dhaka
Times Listed are UTC+6:00.

Group A

Group B

Group C

Group D

Quarter-finals

Semi-finals

Final

References

2015
2015 in Bangladeshi football
Bangladesh